Tourat is a town on the island of Saint Lucia; it is located towards the western coast of the island near Barre Denis.

See also
List of cities in  Saint Lucia
Castries District

References

Towns in Saint Lucia